Ypsolopha cajaliella is a moth of the family Ypsolophidae. It is known from Spain.

References

Ypsolophidae
Moths of Europe